Thysanopsetta naresi is a species of flatfish in the large-tooth flounder family, Paralichthyidae. It is the only member of its genus Thysanopsetta. It can be found in the southeast Pacific Ocean, off the coast of Chile, and in the southwest Atlantic Ocean in Patagonia and in the Falkland region.

It is brownish, mottled and spotted with darker patches. Like the rest of the large-tooth flounders, it has both eyes on the left side of its head.

References

Paralichthyidae
Fish of the Atlantic Ocean
Fish of the Pacific Ocean
Western South American coastal fauna
Taxa named by Albert Günther
Monotypic marine fish genera